Elections were held in Haliburton County, Ontario on October 25, 2010 in conjunction with municipal elections across the province.

Haliburton County Council
The Haliburton County Council consists of the reeves and deputy reeves of the four constituent municipalities. A warden is elected from the eight members.

Algonquin Highlands

Dysart et al

Highlands East

Minden Hills

2010 Ontario municipal elections
Haliburton County